B. Suresh Gowda is an Indian politician and former two-time Member of  Legislative Assembly from Tumkur Rural Constituency,. He is a member of the Bharatiya Janata Party. He is also the former BJP district president from Tumkur. 

B Suresh Gowda is highly admired and appreciated by the voters, for numerous developmental works that he undertook as an MLA. Prior to becoming an MLA he held prominent positions in various organisations, including that of Chairman of Mysore Paper Mills.

Currently he resides in Tumkur Rural, where he is preparing to contest in the upcoming 2023 assembly elections.

Early life and education 
B. Suresh Gowda was born on 15 May 1965 in Hutridurga Hobli, Kunigal Taluk, Tumkur district.

He acquired a Bachelor of Commerce degree from R.C. College Bangalore, Karnataka.

References

Bharatiya Janata Party politicians from Karnataka 
Indian radiologists
People from Tumkur
Kannada people
Living people
1965 births
Karnataka MLAs 2008–2013
Karnataka MLAs 2013–2018